Maikel Zijlaard (born 1 June 1999) is a Dutch racing cyclist, who currently rides for UCI ProTeam .

Major results

Road

2016
 1st Young rider classification, Driedaagse van Axel
 1st Stage 1 (TTT) Sint-Martinusprijs Kontich
 3rd Omloop der Vlaamse Gewesten
 5th Overall La Coupe du Président de la Ville de Grudziądz
2017
 1st Ronde van Vlaanderen Juniores
 1st Menen–Kemmel–Menen
 1st Stages 2 (ITT) & 4 SPIE Internationale Juniorendriedaagse
 6th Overall Trofeo Karlsberg
 6th Guido Reybrouck Classic
 6th E3 Harelbeke Junioren
2021
 9th Ronde van de Achterhoek
2022
 1st  Overall Olympia's Tour
 1st Dorpenomloop Rucphen
 2nd Arno Wallaard Memorial
 10th Overall Okolo jižních Čech
1st  Points classification
1st Stages 2 & 3
2023
 3rd Classic Loire Atlantique
 6th Cholet-Pays de la Loire

Track
2018
 2nd  Derny, European Championships
2019
 National Track Championships
1st  Individual pursuit
1st  Team pursuit
2021
 1st  Elimination race, UEC European Under-23 Track Championships

References

External links

1999 births
Living people
Dutch male cyclists
Sportspeople from Rotterdam
Dutch track cyclists
20th-century Dutch people
21st-century Dutch people